Live in Poland may refer to:

 Live in Poland (Emerson, Lake & Palmer album), 1997
 Live in Poland, a 1997 album by Praxis
 Live in Poland (Wayne Horvitz album), 1994